The 10,000 metres speed skating event was part of the speed skating at the 1936 Winter Olympics programme. The competition was held on Friday, 14 February 1936. Thirty speed skaters from 14 nations competed.

Medalists

Records
These were the standing world and Olympic records (in minutes) prior to the 1936 Winter Olympics.

(*) The record was set in a high altitude venue (more than 1000 metres above sea level) and on naturally frozen ice.

(**) This time was set in pack-style format, having all competitors skate at the same time.

Fifteen speed skaters bettered the twelve years old Olympic record. At first Charles Mathiesen bettered the old record in the first pair with a time of 17:41.2 minutes, then Max Stiepl set a new record with 17:30.0 minutes. Finally Ivar Ballangrud set a new Olympic record with 17:24.3 minutes.

Results

References

External links
Official Olympic Report
 

Speed skating at the 1936 Winter Olympics